The Royal Australasian Ornithologists Union (RAOU) may elect somebody to the position of Fellow, the highest grade of membership, for service to the RAOU and to ornithology.  Fellows of the RAOU are entitled to use the letters FRAOU after their name.  There is a limit to the number of Fellows that may exist at any time and new Fellows are generally only elected when an existing one dies.  In the following list those elected to the similar positions of Corresponding Members or Corresponding Fellows (CM) are included, although this does not appear to have occurred since the 1930s.  Some past and present Fellows, following the years of their election, are:

1939 - Wilfred Backhouse Alexander (1885-1965)
1939 - Gregory Macalister Mathews CBE (1876-1949)
1939 - Ernst Walter Mayr (CM) (USA) (1904-2005)
1939 - Frank Alexander Wetmore (CM) (USA) (1886-1978)
1939 - Robert Cushman Murphy (CM) (USA) (1887-1973)
1939 - Percy Roycroft Lowe (CM) (UK) (1870-1948)
1941 - Archibald George Campbell (1880-1954)
1941 - Alexander Hugh Chisholm OBE (1890-1977)
1949 - Sir Charles Frederic Belcher OBE (1876-1970)
1951 - Keith Alfred Hindwood (1904-1971)
1951 - Dominic Louis Serventy (1904-1988)
1958 - Alan John (Jock) Marshall (1911-1967)
1963 - Arnold Robert McGill OAM (1905-1988)
1965 - James Allen Keast (1922-2009)
1970 - Angus Hargreaves Robinson (1907-1973)
1970 - Wilson Roy Wheeler MBE (1905-1988)
1973 - Herbert Thomas Condon (1912-1978)
1973 - Sir Robert Falla CMG, KBE (1901-1979)
1974 - Sir Charles Alexander Fleming OBE, KBE (1916-1987)
1974 - Harold James Frith AO, FAA, FTSE (1921-1982)
1975 - Stephen Marchant AM (1912-1903)
1980 - Stephen John James Frank Davies
1980 - Allan Reginald McEvey (1919-1996)
1981 - Pauline Reilly OAM (1918-2011)
1983 - Selwyn George (Bill) Lane (1922-2000)
1989 - Ian Cecil Robert Rowley (1926-2009)
1989 - Henry Norman Burgess Wettenhall AM (1915-2000)
1990 - Brian Douglas Bell (1930-2016)
1991 - Norman Chaffer OAM (1899-1992)
1992 - John Warham (1919-2010)
1993 - Margaret Alison Cameron AM (1937- )
1998 - Clive Dudley Thomas Minton AM (1934- )
2003 - Oliver Michael Griffiths Newman
2004 - Stuart Leslie AM ( -2005)

References
Robin, Libby. (2001). ‘’The Flight of the Emu: a hundred years of Australian ornithology 1901-2001’’. Carlton, Vic. Melbourne University Press. 

Australian ornithologists